Goteh Ntignee (born May 10, 2002) is a Beninese footballer who currently plays as a forward for Cavalry FC in the Canadian Premier League.

Early life
Born in Kpomassè, Benin, Ntignee moved to Canada at age four, first settling in Moose Jaw, Saskatchewan, before later moving to Brooks, Alberta and then Coaldale, Alberta, at ages nine and ten respectively.
Ntignee began playing youth soccer with Grasslands SA at age nine. Afterwards, he played with Eastside Memorial FC, later joining the Pacific Elite Soccer Institute. In 2018/19, he played at the senior amateur level with Westcatle United in the Vancouver Island Soccer League winning the league title, while winning the finals MVP and finishing as a finalist for Rookie of the Year.

Club career
In April 2019, he joined the Victoria Highlanders in USL League Two. He scored four goals in eight games during the 2019 season.

In August 2020, Ntignee signed with German fourth-tier Regionalliga Nordost club FC Lokomotive Leipzig. 

On January 31, 2022, he moved to fifth-tier NOFV-Oberliga Süd club FC Grimma.

In August 2022, he signed a multi-year contract with Canadian Premier League club Cavalry FC. On October 8, 2022, he made his debut in the final game of the season against Pacific FC, helping set up the winning goal by Ben Fisk.

International career
In 2017, Ntingee attended a development camp with the Canada U15 team.

In 2019, he attended a camp with the Nigeria U17 team ahead of the 2019 FIFA U-17 World Cup.

Career statistics

References

External links

Goteh Ntignee at FuPa

Living people
2002 births
People from Atlantique Department
Sportspeople from Moose Jaw
Soccer people from Saskatchewan
Soccer people from Alberta
Beninese footballers
Canadian soccer players
Beninese people of Nigerian descent
Canadian people of Nigerian descent
Beninese emigrants to Canada
Association football forwards
USL League Two players
Regionalliga players
NOFV-Oberliga players
Canadian Premier League players
Victoria Highlanders players
1. FC Lokomotive Leipzig players
Cavalry FC players